Karle is a municipality and village in Svitavy District in the Pardubice Region of the Czech Republic. It has about 400 inhabitants.

Administrative parts
The village of Ostrý Kámen is an administrative part of Karle.

References

Villages in Svitavy District